1453 (Turbinlite) Flight Royal Air Force was first formed in 1941 as a night-fighter unit at RAF Wittering, equipped with Douglas Turbinlite Havoc aircraft. In the 1950s the flight was briefly resurrected as an early warning flight and during the 1980s it was employed as a ground attack and air defence unit on the Falkland Islands.

History

1453 Flt and the Turbinlite Havocs
After the fall of France in 1940, outstanding contracts for Douglas DB-7 & DB-7A medium bomber aircraft were appropriated by the British Purchasing Commission. With relatively few aircraft available and the good performance of the DB-7/A, named Havoc in UK service, made them suitable for use as intruders and night-fighters.

Thirty-one of the DB-7's (Havoc I) were converted to carry the 2,700 million candela (2.7Gcd) Helmore Turbinlite searchlight in the nose, as well as Airborne Interception Mk.IV (A.I. Mk.IV) radar. These aircraft were to operate in conjunction with Hawker Hurricane nightfighters, illuminating the targets after tracking them with the radar, for the Hurricane fighters to despatch.

1453 (Turbinlite) Flight was one of the flights, formed on 10 July 1941, especially to use the Turbinlite Havoc operating in conjunction with Hawker Hurricanes of No. 151 Squadron RAF and No. 486 Squadron RNZAF, also housed, like 1453 Flt, at RAF Wittering

Thirty-nine DB-7A's (Havoc II) were also converted to use the Turbinlite searchlights and these also saw service with the Turbinlite flights and the squadrons formed from the flights from 2 September 1942, 1453 Flt becoming No. 532 Squadron RAF (532 Sqn) on 8 September 1942 (not on 2 September due to administrative reasons) and the flight officially disbanded as late as 31 January 1943.

Results of the combined operations were not spectacular, (only one confirmed kill with 31 aircraft lost), but valuable experience in the use of the A.I. (Airborne interception) radar was gained. The Helmore Turbinlite was also evaluated as an anti-submarine attack searchlight, but the Leigh Light was found to be superior.

AEW Neptunes at RAF Kinloss
On 1 November 1952, four Lockheed Neptune MR Mk.1 aircraft ( WX547, WX499, WX500 and WX501) formed the complement of Vanguard Flight of Fighter Command at RAF Kinloss, to research and develop tactics for use by Airborne Early Warning aircraft.

RAF Topcliffe
Disbanded on 5 June 1953 the four Neptune aircraft of Vanguard Flight became the re-formed 1453 (Early Warning) Flight at RAF Topcliffe in Yorkshire. Despite their innocuous public role the Neptunes of 1453 Flight retained the full armament of the P2V-5 variant with nose, dorsal and tail turrets.

Details of 1453 Flight's operations are few and far between, leading to speculation that they may have been involved in highly classified reconnaissance missions over or near Eastern Bloc countries (more info/evidence required), similar to the US Navy's Martin P4M Mercator ELINT (ELectronic INTelligence) aircraft, and the 'Ghost' North American RB-45 Tornado's that flew with RAF crews and markings from RAF Sculthorpe, over eastern Europe to provide radar images of potential targets for RAF and Strategic Air Command (SAC) bombers.

Neptune flying at RAF Topcliffe continued till 1453 (Airborne Early Warning) Flight was disbanded on 30 June 1956.

RAF Stanley Falkland Islands

After the qualified success of RAF Harrier operations in the Falklands conflict, a detachment of six Harrier GR.3A's was established at Stanley airport, which became RAF Stanley, part of BFFI (British Forces Falkland Islands). As the rudimentary facilities at RAF Stanley improved HarDet (Harrier Detachment) Stanley was made autonomous with the formation of 1453 (Tactical Ground Attack) Flight, operating from a MEXE pad apron by the side of the runway at the extreme Western end. Later, semi-permanent facilities were constructed, with Portakabin offices and RUBB hangars, during the extension and reinforcement of the runway.

The Harriers were tasked initially with mostly air defence of the Falklands Garrison. After the arrival of No. 29 Squadron RAF, with their McDonnell-Douglas/Hawker-Siddeley F-4M Phantom FGR.2's from Ascension Island in October 1982, 1453 flight's mission was focused more on ground attack missions, but supplying a back-up QRA (Quick Reaction Alert) in daylight hours.

Operations at RAF Stanley were challenging with makeshift accommodation, few asphalt roads, army discipline, extreme weather, long supply lines, lacklustre catering supplies (e.g. several weeks with nothing but spinach and beetroot for vegetables), not to mention the close proximity of unclearable minefields, and danger of unexploded ordnance.

The Harriers of 1453 Flight continued flying at Stanley until June 1985 when the new airport/airbase RAF Mount Pleasant was opened, after which 1453 Flight disbanded and the Harriers were returned to the UK, leaving the air defence of the Falkland Islands to the Phantoms of 23 Squadron which had relieved 29 Squadron in October 1983.

Aircraft operated

Flight bases

References
Notes

Bibliography

 Braybrook, Roy with Michael Rolfe, Terry Hadler and Mike Chappell. Battle for the Falklands [3]: Air Forces (Osprey – Men-at-arms 135). Botley, Oxfordshire, UK: Osprey, 1982. .
 Burden, Rodney A. and Michael A. Draper (eds.). Falklands – The Air War. London: Arms & Armour Press, 1986. .
 Davies, Peter E. and Anthony M. Thornborough. The Harrier Story. Annapolis, MD: Naval Institute Press, 1997. .
 Delve, Ken. The Source Book of the RAF. Shrewsbury, Shropshire, UK: Airlife Publishing, 1994. .
 Ethell, Jeffery and Alfred Price. Air War South Atlantic. London: Sidgwick & Jackson,
 Halley, James J. The Squadrons of the Royal Air Force & Commonwealth 1918–1988. Tonbridge, Kent, UK: Air Britain (Historians) Ltd., 1988. .
 Jefford, C.G. RAF Squadrons, a Comprehensive record of the Movement and Equipment of all RAF Squadrons and their Antecedents since 1912. Shrewsbury, Shropshire, UK: Airlife Publishing, 1988 (second edition 2001). .
 Lake, Alan. Flying Units of the RAF. Shrewsbury, Shropshire, UK: Airlife Publishing, 1999. .
 Price, Alfred. Harrier at War. Shepperton, Surrey, UK: Ian Allan, 1984. .
 Rawlings, John D.R. Fighter Squadrons of the RAF and their Aircraft. London: Macdonald & Jane's (Publishers) Ltd., 1969 (2nd edition 1976, reprinted 1978). .
 Sturtivant, Ray, ISO and John Hamlin. RAF Flying Training And Support Units since 1912. Tonbridge, Kent, UK: Air-Britain (Historians) Ltd., 2007. .

External links
 https://web.archive.org/web/20091129234858/http://www.rafmuseum.org.uk/cosford/collections/aircraft/lockheed-sp-2h-neptune.cfm
 http://www.raf.mod.uk/rafwittering/rafcms/mediafiles/3A91A8D7_1143_EC82_2ED2C74AA3B6E274.pdf
 http://www.harrier.org.uk/service/1453.htm
 http://www.pprune.org/aviation-history-nostalgia/380943-biggin-hill-photos-early-1950s-1-2-3-merged.html
 https://web.archive.org/web/20041215131431/http://harrier.hyperlinx.cz/FAQ-falklandwar.htm
 http://www.roll-of-honour.com/Regiments/CountyAirfields.html
 https://web.archive.org/web/20161217162442/http://www.ejection-history.org.uk/aircraft_by_type/harrier/harrier.htm
 http://www.verslo.is/baldur/p2/Britain.htm
 https://web.archive.org/web/20100125023232/http://bathead.com/ShawEW.html
 http://www.p2vneptune.com/m02_72.shtml
 http://www.aircraftresourcecenter.com/Rev2/1601-1700/rev1630-freigthdogs-72001/00.shtm
 http://www.aircraftresourcecenter.com/Rev2/1601-1700/rev1630-freigthdogs-72001/00.shtm
 https://web.archive.org/web/20100125023232/http://bathead.com/ShawEW.html
 http://www.harrier.org.uk/service/1453.htm
 http://www.raf.mod.uk/rafwittering/rafcms/mediafiles/3A91A8D7_1143_EC82_2ED2C74AA3B6E274.pdf

1453 Flight
Military units and formations established in 1941